Tchadia Airlines was an airline based at N'Djamena International Airport in N’Djamena, Chad. The airline was the national carrier of Chad.

History
In August 2018, it was announced that the Government of Chad had signed an agreement with Ethiopian Airlines to launch Chad's new national carrier on 1 October 2018. It was also announced the airline would be named Tchadia Airlines and would start operations using a fleet of 2 Bombardier Dash 8 Q400 transferred from Ethiopia, and would initially serve the four main cities in Chad and to neighbouring countries.

After three consecutive years of financial losses, the airline was placed into liquidation.

Destinations
As of September 2018, Tchadia Airlines operated to the following destinations:

Fleet
, Tchadia Airlines operated the following aircraft:

References

Defunct airlines of Chad
Airlines established in 2018
Airlines disestablished in 2022
2018 establishments in Chad
2022 disestablishments in Chad
Ethiopian Airlines